Speranza coortaria, the four-spotted speranza, is a moth in the family Geometridae. The species was first described by George Duryea Hulst in 1887. It is found in North America.

The MONA or Hodges number for Speranza coortaria is 6299.

References

Further reading

External links

 

Macariini
Articles created by Qbugbot
Moths described in 1887